Idah Peterside (born 25 November 1974) is a Nigerian international football goalkeeper and media officer, television pundit and pastor.

He retired from active football in 2002. He is currently a football analyst for SuperSports and Pastor at Christ Ambassadors Church based in Kempton Park, Johannesburg.

References

1974 births
Living people
Nigerian footballers
Nigeria international footballers
Association football goalkeepers